Alfred Püls (12 August 1933 – 10 August 2020) was an Austrian ice hockey player. He competed in the men's tournaments at the 1956 Winter Olympics and the 1964 Winter Olympics.

References

External links
 

1933 births
2020 deaths
Austrian ice hockey players
Olympic ice hockey players of Austria
Ice hockey players at the 1956 Winter Olympics
Ice hockey players at the 1964 Winter Olympics
Sportspeople from Innsbruck
20th-century Austrian people